Shraga Topolansky (born 1950) is an Israeli former footballer who played in Maccabi Netanya, Beitar Tel Aviv and in the National Soccer League and the Victorian Premier League in Australia. Today he works as a manager, with Beitar Hadera being the last team he managed.

Topolansky also won five caps for his national side between 1969 and 1978; however, all of them were friendly games that aren't recognised by Israel Football Association as official games.

Honours
Israeli Premier League
Winner (2): 1970-71, 1973-74
Runner-up (1): 1974-75
State Cup
Runner-up (2): 1970, 1977
Israeli Supercup
Winner (2): 1971, 1974
Footballer of the Year – Israel
1976-77
NSL Cup
Runner-up (1): 1981
Israeli Second Division
Winner (1): 1982–83

References

1950 births
Living people
Israeli footballers
Maccabi Netanya F.C. players
West Adelaide SC players
Beitar Tel Aviv F.C. players
National Soccer League (Australia) players
Expatriate soccer players in Australia
Israeli expatriate sportspeople in Australia
Association footballers not categorized by position
Israeli expatriate footballers
Israeli Footballer of the Year recipients